Carol Hayes (born 31 December 1970) is a former New Zealand rugby union player. She was in the inaugural New Zealand women's XV's squad that played against the California Grizzlies at Christchurch in 1989.

Hayes was spotted by then coach, Laurie O'Reilly, when she played for Southland against Canterbury in a curtain raiser match to Argentina and Canterbury men's clash at Lancaster Park in 1989. She was selected for the Black Ferns for the 1991 Women's Rugby World Cup, however, she did not play in the tournament itself. She featured in their warm up games against local clubs.

Hayes appeared for the Black Ferns in their 36–0 victory against an Auckland XV's team in 1992. She then made her last appearance against a President's XV at Wellington in 1993.

References 

1970 births
Living people
New Zealand female rugby union players
New Zealand women's international rugby union players